The 2021–22 Premier League of Bosnia and Herzegovina, known as Liga 12 and also known as m:tel Premier League for sponsorship reasons, was the 22nd season of the Premier League of Bosnia and Herzegovina, the highest football league of Bosnia and Herzegovina. The season began on 16 July 2021 and ended on 29 May 2022, with a winter break between early December 2021 and late February 2022.

Zrinjski Mostar secured a seventh Premier League title with seven matches to spare; it was also the club's third title in the last six seasons.

Teams
A total of 12 teams contested in the league, including 9 sides from the 2020–21 season and three promoted from each of the second-level leagues, Posušje, Rudar Prijedor and Leotar, replacing relegated sides Mladost Doboj Kakanj, Olimpik and Krupa.

Stadiums and locations

Personnel and kits

Note: Flags indicate national team as has been defined under FIFA eligibility rules. Players and Managers may hold more than one non-FIFA nationality.

League table

Positions by table
The table lists the positions of teams after each week of matches. In order to preserve chronological evolvements, any postponed matches are not included to the round at which they were originally scheduled, but added to the full round they were played immediately afterwards.

Results

Rounds 1–22

Rounds 23–33

Top goalscorers

References

External links

2021–22
Bosnia and Herzegovina
1